Archim is a freeware program for making graphs in two or three dimensions. It is capable of explicit and parametric graphs and uses a (very simple) code-oriented layout for entering function information, so that graphs in polar (or other) coordinates become specific cases of parametric graphs.

External links
 Stochastic Lab.
 Archimy.com - Online version.

Plotting software